Rukmini Varma (born 1940) is an Indian artist based in Bangalore.

Life 
She was born as Bharani Thirunal Rukmini Bayi, Fourth Princess of Travancore to Princess Uthram Thirunal Lalithamba Bayi and Sri Kerala Varma Koil Thampuran Avargal, she is a granddaughter of Maharani Sethu Lakshmi Bayi and belongs to the Travancore Royal Family. Her great great grandfather was Raja Ravi Varma. Her father Kerala Varma is an artist specializing in charcoal and pencil sketches while her son Jay Varma is a colored pencil artist.

In the 1970s she was a member of the advisory council for the Chittrakala Parishat of Bangalore and is currently Chairperson of the Raja Ravi Varma Heritage Foundation, Bangalore, which she founded in September 2015.

Rukmini Varma is a cousin of Shreekumar Varma. She was married to the late Devi Prasad Varma and has two sons, Venugopal Varma and Jaygopal Varma. Her brother Balagopal Varma is the current holder of the title of Elayaraja of Travancore.

See also
 Indian Art
 Travancore Royal Family

References

Indian female royalty
Indian women painters
Living people
1940 births
Artists from Bangalore
Painters from Karnataka
Travancore royal family
20th-century Indian painters
Women artists from Karnataka
Women of the Kingdom of Travancore
20th-century Indian women artists
People of the Kingdom of Travancore
20th-century Indian royalty
21st-century Indian women artists